Aram d'Abro was an Armenian-American science popularizer and author, known for his book The Evolution of Scientific Thought from Newton to Einstein.

There is little biographical information on Aram d'Abro. Several sources erroneously give his first name as "Abraham". A border crossing document from St. Albans, Vermont, dated September 24, 1910, gives his name as "Aram D'Abro", age 24, nationality Turkey, birthplace Paris, occupation professor of coastal engineering, marital status single. According to information from the Van Nostrand Company, Aram d'Abro was educated at Eton College, studied mathematics in Paris, and resided in New York City; he paid the costs of publication of his 2-volume work The Decline of Mechanism in Modern Physics (1939, Van Nostrand).

Abram d’Abro was Aram d'Abro's father. Abram d'Abro was an Armenian financier who settled in Trieste and was related to Muhammad Ali's Minister of Foreign Affairs Boghos Bey Yousefian. The original family name of D'Abro was Abroyan. Boghos Bey brought approximately 2,000 Armenians to Egypt.

Selected publications

References

American writers of Armenian descent
Armenian science writers
American science writers
People educated at Eton College